Pseudoscilla babylonia, common name the Babylon pyram,  is a species of small  sea snail, a marine gastropod mollusk in the family Pyramidellidae, the pyrams and their allies.

References

External links
 To World Register of Marine Species
 

Pyramidellidae
Gastropods described in 1845
Molluscs of the Atlantic Ocean
Molluscs of the Pacific Ocean